WMRZ (98.1 FM) is a radio station broadcasting an urban adult contemporary format. Licensed to Dawson, Georgia, United States, the station serves the Albany area.  The station is owned by iHeartMedia, Inc.  Its studios are on Westover Boulevard in Albany, and the transmitter is located northwest of Albany.

History
The station was assigned call sign WMRZ on May 5, 2003; it signed on in June 2005. The station's logo is similar to the one used by San Francisco sister station KISQ when it had an urban adult contemporary format.

References

External links

MRZ
Urban adult contemporary radio stations in the United States
IHeartMedia radio stations
Radio stations established in 2005